Kaalfontein is a township east of Midrand, South Africa. It is located in Region A of the City of Johannesburg Metropolitan Municipality. Is is usually treated as one suburb with Ebony Park.

References

Johannesburg Region A
Townships in Gauteng